Setchell is a surname. Notable people with the surname include:

 Gary Setchell (born 1975), English football player
 Marcus Setchell (born 1943), British obstetrician and gynecologist
 William Albert Setchell (1864–1943), American botanist

See also
 Sarah Setchel (1803–1894), English water-colour painter
 Setchell Carlson, American electronics manufacturer